Xenarthra (from Ancient Greek ξένος, xénos, "foreign, alien" + ἄρθρον, árthron, "joint") is a major clade of placental mammals native to the Americas. There are 31 living species: the anteaters, tree sloths, and armadillos. Extinct xenarthrans include the glyptodonts, pampatheres and ground sloths. Xenarthrans originated in South America during the late Paleocene about 60 million years ago. They evolved and diversified extensively in South America during the continent's long period of isolation in the early to mid Cenozoic Era. They spread to the Antilles by the early Miocene and, starting about 3 Mya, spread to Central and North America as part of the Great American Interchange. Nearly all of the formerly abundant megafaunal xenarthrans became extinct at the end of the Pleistocene.

Xenarthrans share several characteristics not present in other placental mammals, which suggest their ancestors were subterranean diggers for insects. The ischium of the pelvis is also fused to the sacrum of the spine. Their limb bone structures are unusual, and they have single-color vision. The teeth of Xenarthrans are unique. Xenarthrans are also often considered to be among the most primitive of placental mammals. Females show no clear distinction between the uterus and vagina, and males have internal testicles, which are located between the bladder and the rectum. Xenarthrans have the lowest metabolic rates among therians.

Xenarthran forms and lifestyles include:

 Armadillos: Mostly small and some larger omnivores and insectivores with flexible banded body armor
 Glyptodonts: Large herbivores with a rigid semi-spherical carapace
 Pampatheres: Large herbivores (and possibly omnivores) with banded body armor
 Anteaters: Small to large specialized feeders on social insects 
 Tree sloths: Medium-sized folivores specialized for life hanging upside-down in trees
 Ground sloths: Medium to very large ground-living herbivores (and possibly omnivores)
 Aquatic sloths: Thalassocnus, a medium-sized herbivore, is the only known aquatic sloth

Evolutionary relationships

Xenarthrans were previously classified alongside the pangolins and aardvarks in the order Edentata (meaning toothless, because the members do not have incisors and lack, or have poorly developed, molars). Subsequently, Edentata was found to be a polyphyletic grouping whose New World and Old World taxa are unrelated, and it was split up to reflect their true phylogeny. Aardvarks and pangolins are now placed in individual orders, and the new order Xenarthra was erected to group the remaining families (which are all related). The morphology of xenarthrans generally suggests that the anteaters and sloths are more closely related to each other than either is to the armadillos, glyptodonts, and pampatheres; this idea is upheld by molecular studies. Since its conception, Xenarthra has increasingly come to be considered to be of a higher rank than 'order'; some authorities consider it to be a cohort, while others consider it to be a superorder.

Whatever the rank, Xenarthra is now generally considered to be divided into two orders:

 Cingulata (Latin, "the ones with belts/armor"), the armadillos and the extinct glyptodonts and pampatheres 
 Pilosa (Latin, "the ones with fur"), which is subdivided into: 
 Vermilingua ("worm-tongues"), the anteaters
 Folivora ("leaf-eaters"), the sloths (both tree sloths and the extinct ground sloths). Folivora is also called Tardigrada or Phyllophaga.

Their relationship to other placental mammals is obscure. Xenarthrans have been defined as most closely related to Afrotheria (in the group Atlantogenata), or to Boreoeutheria (in the group Exafroplacentalia), or to Epitheria (Afrotheria+Boreoeutheria, i.e. as a sister group to all other placental mammals). A comprehensive phylogeny by Goloboff et al. includes xenarthrans as a sister clade of Euarchontoglires within Boreoeutheria (Laurasiatheria+Euarchontoglires). Overall, studies using mitochondrial DNA have tended to group them as a sister clade to Ferrungulata (carnivores+ungulates and cetaceans), while studies using nuclear DNA have identified them as 1) a sister clade to Afrotheria, 2) a sister clade to all placentals except Afrotheria, or 3) a trichotomy (three-way split): Afrotheria, Xenarthra, and everything else (i.e. Boreoeutheria). Among studies that use physical characteristics rather than DNA to look at relationships, a large phenomic analysis of living and fossil mammals suggests placental mammals evolved shortly after the end of the Cretaceous, and first split into Xenarthra and Epitheria (all other placentals).

Phylogeny

Below is a recent simplified phylogeny of the xenarthran families based on Slater et al. (2016) and Delsuc et al. (2016). The dagger symbol, "†", denotes extinct groups.

}}

Classification

XENARTHRA
 Order Cingulata
 Family Chlamyphoridae: armadillos and glyptodonts
 Greater fairy armadillo, Calyptophractus retusus
 Pink fairy armadillo, Chlamyphorus truncatus
 Northern naked-tailed armadillo, Cabassous centralis
 Chacoan naked-tailed armadillo, Cabassous chacoensis
 Southern naked-tailed armadillo, Cabassous unicinctus
 Greater naked-tailed armadillo, Cabassous tatouay
 Screaming hairy armadillo, Chaetophractus vellerosus
 Big hairy armadillo, Chaetophractus villosus
 Andean hairy armadillo, Chaetophractus nationi
 Six-banded armadillo or yellow armadillo, Euphractus sexcinctus
 Giant armadillo, Priodontes maximus
 Southern three-banded armadillo, Tolypeutes matacus
 Brazilian three-banded armadillo, Tolypeutes tricinctus
 Pichi or dwarf armadillo, Zaedyus pichiy
 Subfamily †Glyptodontinae: glyptodonts
 Family Dasypodidae: long-nosed armadillos
 Nine-banded armadillo or long-nosed armadillo, Dasypus novemcinctus
 Seven-banded armadillo, Dasypus septemcinctus
 Southern long-nosed armadillo, Dasypus hybridus
 Llanos long-nosed armadillo, Dasypus sabanicola
 Great long-nosed armadillo, Dasypus kappleri
 Hairy long-nosed armadillo, Dasypus pilosus
 Yepes's mulita, Dasypus yepesi
 Family †Pampatheriidae: pampatheres
 Order Pilosa
 Suborder Folivora: sloths
 Family Bradypodidae: three-toed sloths
 Pygmy three-toed sloth, Bradypus pygmaeus
 Brown-throated three-toed sloth, Bradypus variegatus
 Pale-throated three-toed sloth, Bradypus tridactylus
 Maned three-toed sloth, Bradypus torquatus
 Family †Megalonychidae: megalonychid ground sloths
 Family †Megatheriidae: megatheriid ground sloths
 Family †Nothrotheriidae: nothrotheriid ground sloths and aquatic sloths
 Family Choloepodidae: two-toed sloths
 Hoffman's two-toed sloth, Choloepus hoffmanni
 Linnaeus's two-toed sloth or southern two-toed sloth, Choloepus didactylus
 Family †Mylodontidae: mylodontid ground sloths
 Suborder Vermilingua: anteaters
 Family Cyclopedidae: silky anteaters
 Silky anteater, Cyclopes didactylus
 Family Myrmecophagidae: anteaters
 Giant anteater, Myrmecophaga tridactyla
 Northern tamandua, Tamandua mexicana
 Southern tamandua, Tamandua tetradactyla

Characteristics
Xenarthrans share several characteristics not present in other mammals. Authorities have tended to agree they are a primitive group of placental mammals not very closely related to other orders, without agreeing on how to classify them. George Gaylord Simpson first suggested in 1931 that their combination of unique characteristics shows the group evolved from highly specialized early ancestors that lived underground or were nocturnal and dug with their forelimbs to feed on social insects like ants or termites. Most researchers since then have agreed. These extreme characteristics led to their confusion with unrelated groups that had similar specializations (aardvarks and pangolins), and obscures their relationships with other mammals.

Dentition 
The teeth of xenarthrans differ from all other mammals. The dentition of most species is either significantly reduced and highly modified, or absent. With the single exception of Dasypus armadillos and their ancestral genus Propraopus, xenarthrans do not have a milk dentition. They have a single set of teeth through their lives; these teeth have no functional enamel, and usually there are few or no teeth in the front of the mouth and the rear teeth all look alike. As a result, it is impossible to define Xenarthra as having incisors, canines, premolars, or molars. Since most mammals are classified by their teeth, it has been difficult to determine their relationships to other mammals. Xenarthrans may have evolved from ancestors that had already lost basic mammalian dental features like tooth enamel and a crown with cusps; reduced, highly simplified teeth are usually found in mammals that feed by licking up social insects. Several groups of xenarthrans did evolve cheek teeth to chew plants, but since they lacked enamel, patterns of harder and softer dentine created grinding surfaces. Dentine is less resistant to wear than the enamel-cusped teeth of other mammals, and xenarthrans developed open-rooted teeth that grow continuously. Currently, no living or extinct xenarthrans have been found to have the standard mammalian dental formula or crown morphology derived from the ancient tribosphenic pattern.

Spine
The name Xenarthra, which means "strange joints", was chosen because the vertebral joints of members of the group have extra articulations of a type unlike any other mammals. This trait is referred to as "xenarthry." (Tree sloths lost these articulations to increase the flexibility of their spines, but their fossil ancestors had xenarthrous joints.) Additional points of articulation between vertebrae strengthen and stiffen the spine, an adaptation developed in different ways in various groups of mammals that dig for food. Xenarthrans also tend to have different numbers of vertebrae than other mammals; sloths have a reduced number of lumbar vertebrae with either more or fewer cervical vertebrae than most mammals, while cingulates have neck vertebrae fused into a cervical tube, with glyptodonts fusing thoracic and lumbar vertebrae as well.

Vision
Xenarthrans have been determined to have single-color vision. PCR analysis determined that a mutation in a stem xenarthran led to long-wavelength sensitive-cone (LWS) monochromacy (single color vision), common in nocturnal, aquatic and subterranean mammals. Further losses led to rod monochromacy in a stem cingulate and a stem pilosan, pointing to a subterranean ancestry; the ancestors of Xenarthra had the reduced eyesight characteristic of vertebrates that live underground. Some authorities state that xenarthrans lack a functional pineal gland; pineal activity is related to the perception of light.

Metabolism
Living xenarthrans have the lowest metabolic rates among therians. Paleoburrows have been discovered which are up to 1.5m wide and 40m long, with claw marks from excavation referred to the ground sloths Glossotherium or Scelidotherium. Remains of ground sloths (Mylodon and others) in caves are particularly common in colder parts of their range, suggesting ground sloths may have used burrows and caves to help regulate their body temperature. Analysis of the fossil South American Lujan fauna suggests far more large herbivorous mammals were present than similar contemporary environments can support. As most large Lujan herbivores were xenarthrans, low metabolic rate may be a feature of the entire clade, allowing relatively low-resource scrublands to support large numbers of huge animals. Faunal analysis also shows far fewer large predators in pre-GABI South American faunas than would be expected based on current faunas in similar environments. This suggests other factors than predation controlled the numbers of xenarthrans. South America had no placental predatory mammals until the Pleistocene, and xenarthran large-mammal faunas may have been vulnerable to many factors including a rise in numbers of mammalian predators, resource use by spreading North American herbivores with faster metabolisms and higher food requirements, and climate change.

References

External links

 
 

 
Mammal superorders
Extant Paleocene first appearances
Taxa named by Edward Drinker Cope